The 1966 Little All-America college football team is composed of college football players from small colleges and universities who were selected by the Associated Press (AP) as the best players at each position. For 1966, the AP selected two teams, each team having separate offensive and defensive platoons.

Halfback Carl Garrett of New Mexico Highlands received first-team honors as a sophomore. He received the same honor again in 1967 and 1968 and went on to be named AFL Rookie of the Year in 1969.

Dwayne Nix of Texas A&I won first-team honors at offensive end and was later inducted into the College Football Hall of Fame.

Linebacker John Huard of Maine also received first-team honor and was later inducted into the College Football Hall of Fame. He was the first player form the University of Maine to be inducted.

First team

Offense
 Quarterback - Donald Horn (senior, 6'2", 195 pounds), San Diego
 Halfback - Carl Garrett (sophomore, 6'1", 195 pounds), New Mexico Highlands
 Halfback - Donald Haas (junior, 5'11", 196 pounds), Montana State
 Fullback - John Ogles (senior, 5'10", 190 pounds), Austin Peay
 End - Joseph Peyton (senior, 6'4", 194 pounds), Puget Sound
 End - Dwayne Nix (sophomore, 5'11", 175 pounds), Texas A&I
 Tackle - Herbert Slattery (senior, 6'3", 240 pounds), Delaware
 Tackle - Fred Davis (senior, 6'2", 245 pounds), Doane
 Guard - Harry Sorrell (senior, 6'1", 210 pounds), Chattanooga
 Guard - William Stringer (senior, 6'1", 232 pounds), Southwest Missouri
 Center - David Edmondson (senior, 5'11", 215 pounds), Cal Poly

Defense
 Defensive end - Ronald McCall (senior, 6'2", 235 pounds), Weber State
 Defensive end - Joseph Egresitz (senior, 6'2", 210 pounds), Gettysburg
 Defensive tackle - Kenneth Ozee (senior, 6'2", 221 pounds), Arlington State
 Defensive tackle - Mark DeVilling (senior, 6'2", 215 pounds), Muskingum
 Middle guard - Walter Odegaard (senior, 6'0", 230 pounds), North Dakota State
 Linebacker - Dick Ries (senior, 6'3", 225 pounds), Northern Arizona
 Linebacker - John Huard (senior, 6'1", 225 pounds), Maine
 Linebacker - Roger Bonk (senior, 5'11", 225 pounds), North Dakota
 Defensive back - Ray Vinson (senior, 6'0", 185 pounds), Jacksonville State
 Defensive back - Al Dodd (senior, 5'11", 185 pounds), Northwest Louisiana
 Defensive back - Mel Thake (senior, 6'0", 190 pounds), Superior State

Second team

Offense
 Quarterback - Bob Berezowitz, Whitewater State
 Halfback - Terry Gwin, Arkansas State
 Halfback - Michael Love, Abilene Christian
 Fullback - Robert Mitchell, Vermont
 End - Donald Larson, Minn.-Duluth
 End - Larry Fowler, Hillsdale
 Tackle - Paul Maczuzak, Bucknell
 Tackle - Edward Joyner, Lenoir-Rhyne
 Guard - Curtis Marker, Northern Michigan
 Guard - Terry Pitts, Fresno
 Center - Al DuBouis, Franklin & Marshall

Defense
 Defensive end - Claude Humphrey, Tennessee State
 Defensive end - Leo Carroll, San Diego
 Defensive tackle - Thomas Sears, Georgetown (Kentucky)
 Defensive tackle - Don Williams, Wofford
 Middle guard - LeRoy Gray, East Tennessee
 Linebacker - Thomas McNeil, Waynesburg
 Linebacker - Jeff Stagg, San Diego
 Linebacker - David Ragusa, Rochester
 Defensive back - Alfred Avila, Sul Ross
 Defensive back - Louis Pfaadt, Eastern Kentucky
 Defensive back - Paul Wallerga, Santa Barbara

See also
 1966 College Football All-America Team

References

Little All-America college football team
Little All-America college football team
Little All-America college football teams